Designed by Dante Giacosa, the Fiat 100 engine first appeared in a  form in the all-new Fiat 600 in 1955. The in-line four-cylinder engine comprised an iron block and an aluminium cylinder head with pushrod actuated valves. The engine was produced at Fiat's Mirafiori (Turin) plant, and then at Bielsko-Biała, and remained in production until 2000, used in Fiat Panda and Fiat Seicento in its last  capacity version fitted with SPI single-point injection and hydraulic tappets, although slowly being phased out starting from 1985 in favour of the new Fiat FIRE engine.
It was also produced until 2008 in the Zastava plants in Kragujevac.

Engine specifications

The 100-series engine has a three main bearing crankshaft, a cast iron block and an aluminium cylinder head with an integrated intake manifold. The camshaft was placed in the block and was chain driven. There were 2 overhead valves per cylinder, actuated by an OHV valvetrain. Early versions were fed by a carburettor, but single point fuel injection with catalyst would appear in the early '90s to fulfill anti-pollution laws, along with electronic Distributorless Ignition System.

Applications
List of vehicles utilising variations of the Fiat 100-series engine.

 Fiat/SEAT 600 (1955)
 Fiat 600 Multipla (1955)
 Fiat 600 Abarth 750/850/1000 (1957)
 SEAT 800  (1964)
 Fiat 850 1964
 Fiat 850 Coupé and Spider (1965)
 Fiat 850T (1965)
 Fiat 770 Coupé Vignale (1968)
 Fiat 850 Special (1968)
 Fiat 850 Sport Coupé and Sport Spider (1968)
 Autobianchi A112 (1969)
 Fiat/SEAT 127 (1971)
 Fiat/SEAT 133 (1974)
 Fiat 900T (1976)
 Fiat Uno 45 (1983)
 Fiat/SEAT Panda 45 (1980)
 Seat Marbella (1988)
 Seat Trans/Terra (1986)
 Seat Ibiza Junior (1986)
 Fiat Fiorino (1977)
 Fiat Cinquecento (1992)
 Fiat Seicento(1998)
(1962 - 2012)
 Yugo Koral (1978-2008)
Zastava 600 (1961)
Zastava 750 (1962 - 1985)

SOHC
Straight-four engines
Gasoline engines by model